Erlend Mamelund (born 1 May 1984) is a retired Norwegian handball player who played for Haslum HK and for the Norwegian national team.

Club career
Mamelund played professionally in the German Bundesliga. He won the EHF Cup with HSG Nordhorn in 2007-08. Former clubs are Helset IF and Haslum HK. Mamelund has signed a transfer to the Danish Handball League side FCK Håndbold, which will be his club from July 2009. On 19 August 2015 it was announced that Erlend Mamelund would join German side THW Kiel immediately on a one-year deal.
He then finished his career at Haslum HK in 2017. He wore the Haslum jersey 311 times and scored 1811 goals in 13 seasons. He then signed a three-year deal as the assistant coach of Haslum from 2017 to 2020.

International career
Mamelund made his debut on the Norwegian national handball team in 2005.

Personal life
His older brother Håvard and younger sister Linn Therese both played handball in the highest league in Norway. He is married to Karoline Mamelund.

References

External links 
 

1984 births
Living people
Norwegian male handball players
Expatriate handball players
Norwegian expatriate sportspeople in France
Norwegian expatriate sportspeople in Germany
Norwegian expatriate sportspeople in Denmark
Sportspeople from Bærum
Handball-Bundesliga players
SG Flensburg-Handewitt players
HSG Nordhorn-Lingen players
THW Kiel players
People from Lørenskog